Diocese of Kon Tum is a Roman Catholic diocese of Vietnam. The bishop since 2015 is Aloysius Gonzaga Nguyễn Hùng Vị. More than 16% of the million persons living in its area are Roman Catholics. Many of them belong to ethnic minorities.

The diocese covers an area of 25,728 km² of central Vietnam. It is a suffragan diocese of the Archdiocese of Huế. It was erected as a Vicariate Apostolic on January 18, 1932. On November 24, 1960, it was elevated to a diocese. In 1967, some of the territory was split off to form the new Diocese of Ban Mê Thuột.

Ordinaries

Vicars Apostolic
    Martial-Pierre-Marie Jannin, M.E.P. (10 January 1933 - 16 July 1940)
    Jean-Liévin-Joseph Sion, M.E.P. (23 December 1941 - 19 August 1951)
    Paul-Léon Seitz, M.E.P. (19 June 1952 - 24 November 1960)

Bishops
 Paul-Léon Seitz, M.E.P. (24 November 1960 - 2 October 1975)
 Alexis Phạm Văn Lộc (2 October 1975 - 8 April 1995)
 Peter Trần Thanh Chung (8 April 1995 - 16 July 2003)
 Michael Hoàng Ðức Oanh (16 July 2003 - 7 October 2015)
 Aloysius Gonzaga Nguyễn Hùng Vị (7 October 2015 – present)

External links
General Information on the diocese

Kontum
Christian organizations established in 1932
Roman Catholic dioceses and prelatures established in the 20th century
Kontum, Roman Catholic Diocese of